Inpaint is a graphics software for retouching photos and removing unwanted objects, supported on Microsoft Windows and Macintosh.

Features
Inpaint focuses on photo editing via simplified semi-automatic tools and mechanisms. The program includes a tool similar to the Healing Brush tool in Adobe Photoshop CS5 with the Content-Aware mode on. Similar to Healing Brush, the tool tries to replace bad or damaged texture with good texture from another area to create a seamless repair of an image.

Specifically, Inpaint is capable of performing the following functions:
Removal of unwanted objects from an image
Facial retouching
Old photos repair
Arbitrary merging of multiple images into one
Object cloning
Restoring empty areas on panorama photos

Batch processing of multiple images is possible via the Batch Inpaint version.

It also contains online tutorials.

References

Photo software
Graphics software